The Transcaucasian Highway or TransKAM (ТрансКАМ) is a mountain highway in the South Caucasus region, connecting southern Russia and Georgia.

Geography

As the A164 highway, it crosses the Greater Caucasus mountain range through the Roki Tunnel, connecting North Ossetia–Alania and Russia with South Ossetia and Georgia. In the winter months the road is often closed due to the danger of avalanches.

In Georgia, the highway begins in Gori as S10 highway. It then crosses to Russia through the Roki Tunnel as road A164 to Alagir.

History
It was built by the Soviet Union (USSR) between 1971 and 1986, as an alternative to the older Georgian Military Road and Ossetian Military Road, to connect the USSR and the Georgian Soviet Socialist Republic. 

Since the breakaway of South Ossetia from Georgia in August 2008, crossing from Georgia to South Ossetia at Tskhinvali is not possible.

Roads in Georgia (country)
Roads in Russia
South Caucasus
International road networks
Georgian Soviet Socialist Republic
Transport in North Ossetia–Alania
Roads in South Ossetia
1981 establishments in the Soviet Union
1981 establishments in Georgia (country)